Prestone Tynsong is an Indian politician who is serving as the 3rd Deputy Chief Minister of Meghalaya and minister of Public Works Department (Roads), Animal Husbandry,Veterinary,Housing,Labour and Parliamentary Affairs,Government of Meghalaya since 2018.He is a member of NPP since 2017 and INC before 2017.Tynsong represents the Pynursla constituency in the Meghalaya Legislative Assembly since 2013.

Political career 
He was elected for the Lyngkyrdem Assembly Constituency in 2003 and 2008 on the Indian National Congress ticket, before shifting his seat to Pynursla Assembly Constituency in 2013.

In 2017, he quit the Indian National Congress for the National People's Party.

In 2018, he became Deputy Chief Minister of Meghalaya in the Conrad Sangma led cabinet.

References

People from East Khasi Hills district
National People's Party (India) politicians
Meghalaya MLAs 2013–2018
Living people
1971 births
Meghalaya MLAs 2018–2023
Deputy chief ministers of Meghalaya
Indian National Congress politicians